The California State University Employees Union (CSUEU)/SEIU 2579 represents approximately 15,500 healthcare, operations, administrative and technical support staff at the California State University's 23 campuses and the Office of the Chancellor. CSUEU, representing Bargaining Units 2, 5, 7, 9, and 13, is affiliated with the Service Employees International Union and the California State Employees Association.

External links
Official site

Service Employees International Union
Trade unions in California
Tertiary education trade unions
State wide trade unions in the United States